The cocoa pod borer (Conopomorpha cramerella) is a moth of the family Gracillariidae. It is known from Saudi Arabia, China, India (West Bengal, Andaman Islands), Thailand, Brunei, Indonesia (Sumatra, Sulawesi, Papua, Papua Barat, Java, Kalimantan, Moluccas), Malaysia (Peninsula, Sarawak, Sabah), Vietnam, Australia, New Britain, the Philippines, Samoa, the Solomon Islands, Sri Lanka, Taiwan and Vanuatu.

The larvae feed on Cynometra cauliflora, Swietenia species, Dimocarpus longan, Litchi chinensis, Nephelium lappaceum, Nephelium litchi, Nephelium malainse, Nephelium mutabile, Pometia species (including Pometia pinnata), Cola species and Theobroma cacao. The larvae tunnel into the center of the fruit, where they feed on the seeds for about two to three weeks. They chew their way out of the fruit to pupate.

The economic impact of this pest on cacao-dependent economies is enormous.

References

Conopomorpha
Moths of Asia
Moths described in 1904